St Thomas More Catholic School is a coeducational secondary school and sixth form with academy status, located in Wood Green, London N22. The school was founded in 1952 at Holcombe Road Tottenham, London N17, fourteen years after work had begun on the buildings. It is the only Roman Catholic secondary school in the London Borough of Haringey.

The school today
The school has improved its standing in the examination result tables since the appointment in 2010 of executive headteacher, Martin Tissot, who is also headteacher of St George's Roman Catholic Secondary School in Maida Vale. In 2013, the pupils achieved 91% 5 A-Cs in GCSE, including English and Maths, putting them at the top of the table of Haringey secondary schools to become the "most improved school in the country". St Thomas More achieved academy status in March 2013 and Ofsted judged the school to be outstanding in June 2013.

New buildings include a Duke of Edinburgh Award training centre, a dance studio, music studios, drama studios, a multi gym and a floodlit astroturf pitch.

Notable former pupils
Emma Ania, athlete
Pops Mensah-Bonsu, former NBA player
Samantha Fox, singer and glamour model
Tony Jarrett, hurdler
Stefflon Don, Rapper and singer
Lawrence Vigouroux, footballer

References

External links
Official website
 Haringey Council: St Thomas More Catholic School

1952 establishments in England
Academies in the London Borough of Haringey
Catholic secondary schools in the Archdiocese of Westminster
Educational institutions established in 1952
Secondary schools in the London Borough of Haringey
Wood Green